ARA Salta (S-31) is a Type 209 diesel-electric attack submarine in service with the Argentine Navy. The vessel was reported as incapable of navigation as of 2020. However, Argentine navy divers were reported to be using her as a training platform at dockside.

See also 
 
 Type 214 submarine

History 
ARA Salta (S-31) is one of two Type 209 acquired by the Armada Argentina; the other is ARA San Luis (S-32), which participated in the Falklands/Malvinas conflict in 1982 and was retired from service in 1997.

ARA Salta (S-31), has participated during the 1978 crisis, together with other Argentine surface ships and submarines. The Argentine Navy was deployed to the South Atlantic for a possible intervention against Chile. This war was avoided because a peaceful solution was achieved.

During 1982, the S-31 was not available because of several mechanic problems; mainly the torpedo firing system; a successful trial was performed on 15 June, when the conflict was over. 

Since then, the S-31 has participated in several national and international exercises, and also spent many years patrolling the Argentine sea. As of 2022 the submarine is still in service, as a training platform for tactic divers (Buzos Tacticos) of the Argentine Navy; also for other drill exercises and basic submarine training.

References

Notes

Further reading

External links 

 History of Submarine force at Official site, in spanish
 Official site of the Armada Argentina -Official Museum, in spanish
 Argentine Submarine Force, in spanish at deyseg.com.ar
  Argentine Navy official website - Submarine Force page (Poder Naval - Fuerza de Submarinos - Unidades  (accessed 2017-02-04)

Salta-class submarines
Ships built in Kiel
1972 ships
Ships built in Argentina
Cold War submarines of Argentina
Mar del Plata